The 1951–52 Santa Clara Broncos men's basketball team represented Santa Clara University as an Independent during the 1951–52 NCAA men's basketball season. They finished the season with a 17–12 record and made the NCAA tournament Final Four for the first time school history. They were led by second-year head coach Bob Feerick.

Coming into the 1951–52 season off of a 9–15 record the year before, the Broncos remained under the radar. Even during the 1952 Final Four season they were inconsistent: through the first 14 games the Broncos went 7–7, including a three-game losing streak. They found their rhythm on February 1 against San Francisco State. The Broncos' 67–51 victory began a streak in which Santa Clara won eight of their final 11 games, capped by an improbable deep NCAA Tournament run. In the NCAA West Regional they won their opening match against UCLA, 68–59. The next day, the Broncos topped , 56–53, to advance to the national semifinals.

Santa Clara would go on to lose to Kansas in the Final Four by a score of 55–74. They then lost again in the third-place game, falling 64–67 to Illinois, ending the NCAA tournament in fourth place – Santa Clara's best ever finish.

Schedule and results

|-
!colspan=9 style=| Regular Season

|-
!colspan=9 style=| NCAA Tournament

References

Santa Clara Broncos men's basketball seasons
Santa Clara
Santa Clara
NCAA Division I men's basketball tournament Final Four seasons
Santa Clara Broncos Men's Basketball
Santa Clara Broncos Men's Basketball